Pravin Patkar is an Indian academic and human rights activist. He co-founded Prerana, an NGO working for child protection & anti-human trafficking. In 1999, he founded Asia's first Anti-Human Trafficking Resource Centre supported by the US Government. He has served as an expert on several national and international agencies working in the anti-human trafficking sector. He has been in the teaching profession for over 40 years in both formal and non-formal education sectors. He has written books, published articles and created PSAs to prevent organized violence against women & children.

Personal life

Pravin Patkar was born in Mumbai. He completed his PhD in Social Provisioning in Prostitution from Mumbai University. He is married to social activist Priti Patkar.

Teaching

Pravin Patkar has been in the teaching profession for the past 40 years. He was part of the teaching faculty at TISS Mumbai for 20 years teaching social work and guiding research. He took voluntary retirement in 1995 as associate professor. He is currently adjunct teaching as a professor at Amrita Vishwa Vidyapeetham in Ettimadai, Coimbatore.

Patkar began a migrating education system and managed a residential school for children of tribes in bonded labor for 25 years.

Activism

He fought against tribal bondage and environmental destruction in the ecologically sensitive Western Ghats through a platform named Pariwartan-84. He closed down illegal activity and rehabilitated 70,000 families of seasonally migrant tribes.
Under Prerana, he initiated comprehensive 24–7 field action to protect children born in red light districts from second generation trafficking into the sex trade.
He coordinated relief work in 1977 Andhra Pradesh Cyclone, Bhopal Gas Tragedy 1985, Morbi Flood Gujarat, The Worli Riots 1986, and the Jambhulpada Flood 1988.
He fought for drought-affected paddy cultivators of the backwater zones of Coastal Maharashtra, initiating a Kharland Development programme with the help of European Union.
He has filed the highest number of Public Interest Litigation cases on trafficking and commercial sexual exploitation in India, and obtained the most landmark rulings and directives.
He made the first case to close brothels in India.
He started Fight Trafficking a resource portal on anti-trafficking.

Positions held
Co-founder and chairman of Prerana.
Founder & Managing Trustee of Pariwartan-84.
Elected as vice-chairperson on the global governing board of ECPAT International.
Director of Anti-Trafficking Center supported by Bureau of International Narcotics and Law Enforcement Affairs, State Department, US, and UNIFEM South Asian Regional Office.
First project director of the 'Children Affected by AIDS' program, sponsored by USAID & FHI 360
Member of the advisory board of Aarambh India, an initiative against child sexual abuse and exploitation in India

Research and recognition

Planning Commission (India)- Development Impact of Irrigation Schemes under the Employment Guarantee Scheme: Irrigation Systems, A Cost Benefit Analysis
International Labour Organization- Labour Market Analysis & Monitoring.
International Rice Research Institute, Manila – Technological Infusion and Employment of Women in Rice Cultivation: A Study in Agro-Economics.
Board of Research Studies, TISS- Tribal Bondage, Migration, and Environmental Destruction.
Planning Department Government of Maharashtra– Study of Bonded Labor System in the State of Maharashtra.(1976–77)
UNESCAP and Association of Schools of Social Work in India (ASSWI) Working with the Poor: Social Intervention in Disadvantaged Groups (1978–79)
Grouppe Development France, South Asia Office- Case Study on Indo-Bangladesh Cross Border Trafficking of Children (2008–2009)
UNICEF Maharashtra- Six District Study of The Situation of Trafficking of Children and Children of Victims of Trafficking. (1999–2000)
UNICEF New Delhi- Nine Case Studies of Organizations Working Against Child Trafficking in the State of Maharashtra. (2002–2003)
National Commission for Women India- A Legal Study of Anti Trafficking Legislation in India (2000 –2001–2002).
Commonwealth Foundation, U.K.- Water Conservation & Management: A Case Study on Sustainable Development (1988)
Terre des Hommes, Germany- (India programme)- Project Evaluation. 
World Bank- Agricultural Wages Disaggregation of Regional Level Data. A Quantitative Analysis (1985–86)

Recognition

In August 2018 Power Brands awarded  Patkar the Bharatiya Manavata Vikas Puraskar (Indian Humanism Development Award) for his nation-building initiatives through “Prerana” and fighting the good fight against human trafficking, protecting thousands of women and children and rehabilitating several hundred of them and for being a guardian angel and change-maker for women of all ages, who are victims of sex trade and trafficking.

Published work (selected non-fiction)

In Search of New Legislation Against Commercial Sexual Exploitation & Trafficking
Trafficking & Commercial Sexual Exploitation: International Conventions, Laws, & Policy
Frequently Asked Questions on Commercial Sexual Exploitation and Trafficking.
ARMOUR: A Resource Directory for Police, judges and State Agencies & Voluntary Agencies engaged in Anti Trafficking Work
Report of Research on Incidence of Trafficking of Children for Commercial Sexual Exploitation and Situation of Children of Victims of CSE&T
Home Investigation Report – An Effective Guide in Post Rescue Operation of Minor Girls.
Report on Sex Tourism on West Coast of India
Post Rescue Operation
Manual on Positive Intervention in Trafficking & Commercial Sexual Exploitation of Children
Children Affected by AIDS: Lessons Learnt

Published work (selected fiction)

Fieldwork (1990), winner of the Maharashtra State Award (1992) and the Shree Da Panwalkar Award (1991) for the Best Collection of Short Stories.
Sati (1996). 
Kunachya Khandyavar (2010)

References

External links

Social workers from Maharashtra
Social workers
Living people
Writers from Mumbai
Year of birth missing (living people)